is a Japanese former alpine skier who competed in the 1980 Winter Olympics and 1984 Winter Olympics.

External links
 sports-reference.com

1955 births
Living people
Japanese male alpine skiers
Olympic alpine skiers of Japan
Alpine skiers at the 1980 Winter Olympics
Alpine skiers at the 1984 Winter Olympics
20th-century Japanese people